Jerry Walker (born 1938) is a Canadian retired ice hockey winger who was one of the most prolific goal scorers in NCAA history. He was an All-American in 1961 and helped Denver win consecutive national championships.

Career
Walker was one of several players who played on the Regina Pats in the mid-1950s to be recruited by their former coach Murray Armstrong to play for the University of Denver. He joined the varsity squad as a sophomore in 1959 and started scoring goals for the Pioneers immediately. He recorded 31 in his first season to lead the team and scored the first goal in Denver's championship victory. Walker became the star of the team the following season when he set numerous program and conference records by scoring 56 goals in 32 games. He was the first player named as the WCHA Most Valuable Player and was first team First Team All-WCHA and an All-American. In the NCAA Tournament Walker was one of the focal points of the offense and led Denver to a second consecutive championship as well as a 30–1–1 record to complete one of the most dominant seasons in NCAA history.

Despite having a year of eligibility remaining, Walker left Denver after 1961 and played professional and senior hockey for the remainder of the decade before retiring in 1969. He was inducted into the Denver Athletic Hall of Fame in 1999. Walker is still regarded as one of if not the best goal-scorer in the history of the Denver Pioneers. Among the Denver Pioneers records he still holds are goals in a season (56), goals per game (1.32), hat-tricks (13), hat-tricks in one season (10), and he held the record for most goals in a season by any WCHA player until 1986.

Career statistics

Awards and honors

References

External links

1938 births
Living people
AHCA Division I men's ice hockey All-Americans
Canadian ice hockey defencemen
Denver Pioneers men's ice hockey players
Ice hockey people from Saskatchewan
Jacksonville Rockets players
NCAA men's ice hockey national champions
Regina Pats players
Omaha Knights (IHL) players
Saskatoon Quakers players
Yorkton Terriers players